Joseph A. Kozlak, Sr. (July 8, 1896 – August 14, 1966) was an American lawyer, funeral director, and politician.

Kozlak was born in Minneapolis, Minnesota. He went to Saint Thomas Academy and University of Minnesota. He went to law school and was admitted to the Minnesota bar. Kozlak was a funeral director. Kozlak served in the United States Army. He served in the Minnesota Senate from 1935 to 1938 and was a Democrat. Kozlak also served in the Minnesota House of Representatives from 1921 to 1922, 1925 to 1934, and from 1941 to 1942. His son John S. Kozlak also served in the Minnesota Legislature.

Notes

1896 births
1966 deaths
Lawyers from Minneapolis
Politicians from Minneapolis
Military personnel from Minneapolis
American funeral directors
University of Minnesota alumni
Democratic Party members of the Minnesota House of Representatives
Democratic Party Minnesota state senators
20th-century American politicians
20th-century American lawyers